Foglizzo is a comune (municipality) in the Metropolitan City of Turin in the Italian region Piedmont, located about  northeast of Turin. It is part of the Canavese historical region.

Foglizzo borders the following municipalities: San Giorgio Canavese, San Giusto Canavese, Caluso, Bosconero, San Benigno Canavese, and Montanaro. It is mentioned for the first time in an 882  document, when it was owned by the bishop of Vercelli. Later it was a possessions of the counts of Biandrate and, from 1631, of the Dukes of Savoy. Located there is a castle, perhaps of Roman origins, turned into a noble residence in the 17th and 18th centuries.

References

Cities and towns in Piedmont
Canavese